William Ungoed Jacob (6 October 1910 – 18 December 1990) was an eminent Anglican priest and author in the 20th century.

He was born on 6 October 1910, and educated at Llandovery College and Jesus College, Oxford. He trained for ordination at Wycliffe Hall, Oxford and was ordained deacon in 1934 and priest in 1935. After curacies in Aberystwyth and Lampeter he held incumbencies at Blaenau Ffestiniog and Hubberston after which he was Archdeacon of Carmarthen and then Dean of Brecon.

References

20th-century Welsh Anglican priests
1910 births
People educated at Llandovery College
Alumni of Jesus College, Oxford
Deans of Brecon Cathedral
1990 deaths

20th-century Anglican theologians